GCP Stadium was a football stadium in Nicosia, Cyprus. It had a capacity of 12,000 and was built in 1902 with donations given by Greek Cypriot Nicosians. On 17 October 1934, after a general assembly of the GCP association, the stadium was renamed "GCP Stadium, Eugenia and Antonios Theodotou" in honor of the stadium's major benefactors.

The stadium served as the home stadium for the Nicosia football clubs of Trust, APOEL, Olympiakos Nicosia, Omonia, Orfeas Nicosia, AYMA and Çetinkaya Türk S.K. The Cyprus national football team had also played home games there in the past. It was located at the centre of Nicosia and often used for large music concerts as well. The stadium was largely demolished in 1999. Today the grounds are used as a park and ride facility. In 2013, the theater building of the Cyprus Theatre Organisation was completed and inaugurated in the western side of the old stadium.

References

Defunct sports venues in Cyprus
Sports venues demolished in 1999
Demolished buildings and structures in Cyprus